Neophrida porphyrea is a species of snout moth in the genus Neophrida. It was described by Whalley in 1964, and is known from French Guiana.

References

Moths described in 1964
Tirathabini